Vitsi is a former municipality in Kastoria regional unit, West Macedonia, Greece. Since the 2011 local government reform it is part of the municipality Kastoria, of which it is a municipal unit. It takes its name from Mount Vitsi which is the highest point within the municipal unit. The municipal unit has an area of 135.028 km2. The population is 1,275 (2011).  It includes the villages of Sidirochori (Σιδηροχώρι), Foteini (Φωτεινή), Metamorfosi (Μεταμόρφωση), Toichio (Τοιχιό), Vyssinia (Βυσσινιά), Oxya (Οξυά), Polykerasos (Πολυκέρασος) and Poimeniko (Ποιμενικό).  The village of Poimeniko has no permanent residents anymore.  The seat of the municipality was in Toichio.

External links
Official website (in Greek)

References

Former municipalities in Western Macedonia
Populated places in Kastoria (regional unit)

bg:Вич (дем)